Chahar Borj (also Romanized as Chahār Borj) is a village in Darvahi Rural District of Ab Pakhsh District, Dashtestan County, Bushehr province, Iran. At the 2006 census, its population was 1,253 in 255 households, when it was a village in Shabankareh District. The following census in 2011 counted 1,088 people in 257 households, by which time the rural district had become a part of Ab Pakhsh District. The latest census in 2016 showed a population of 1,294 people in 377 households; it was the largest village in its rural district.

References 

Populated places in Dashtestan County